Bryan James Spears (born April 19, 1977) is an American film and television producer. He is the older brother of singers Britney Spears and Jamie Lynn Spears, and was co-manager of Britney's conservatorship. He was also a co-producer of the television program Zoey 101, which starred Jamie Lynn.

Biography
Spears was born to James Parnell Spears and Lynne Irene Spears (née Bridges) on April 19, 1977 in McComb, Mississippi. He was born with a bacterial lung infection and had to be hooked to an IV before overcoming the infection about a week later. In Lynne's book, Through the Storm: A Real Story of Fame and Family in a Tabloid World, she recalls how she thought Spears was going to die and pleaded with God to let him live. He is of  English, Maltese, Scottish, Scots-Irish/Northern Irish, Irish, French, and Welsh ancestry.

Spears’s father worked as a construction contractor and his mother worked as a second-grade teacher. The family attended First Baptist Church in Kentwood, Louisiana.

Spears attended Parklane Academy in McComb, a private Christian school that serves grades K-12.  After graduating high school, Spears attended Southeastern Louisiana University in Hammond, his mother's alma mater. While attending university, he majored in kinesiology.

Over New Years in 2009, Spears married Graciella Sanchez, manager of Jamie Lynn and founder of One Talent Management. The two wed in a small, private ceremony in New Orleans. Sanchez is a graduate of Yale University. Together the two have one daughter, Sophia Alexandra "Lexie" Spears. Sanchez filed for divorce in August 2015.

Business
After his sister Britney became famous, Spears started working as a manager for Spears family interests, including acting as producer for a number of Jamie Lynn’s projects.

Before his father James gained conservatorship over Britney in 2008, Spears was paid $200,000 for "services rendered."

Filmography

References

External links
 

1977 births
American people of Maltese descent
American television producers
Living people
People from Kentwood, Louisiana
People from McComb, Mississippi
Parklane Academy alumni
Southeastern Louisiana University alumni
Bryan